Solitude Nomade is the first solo album of Christine Ott, ondist (Ondes Martenot player) and pianist. The album is composed of instrumental tracks, in which the Ondes Martenot are the key instrument. (Pensées sauvages, Tropismes, Déchirures...). It was recorded with the help of 15 separate collaborators, including Yann Tiersen, Anne-Gaëlle Bisquay, François Pierron, Thierry Balasse, Eric Groleau, Monique Pierrot, Marc Sens, Ophir Lévy.

Track listing
All music and lyrics are written by Christine Ott

 Pensées sauvages - 3:38
 Tropismes - 4:35
 L'autre rive - 5:15
 Chemin vert - 6:48
 Tête à l'envers - 3:03
 Docks - 3:52
 Solitude Nomade - 4:31
 Lucioles - 9:11
 Déchirures - 5:40
 Lullaby - 5:40

Additional musicians

 Yann Tiersen - violin (on 1) 
 Anne-Gaëlle Bisquay - cello (1,7,10) 
 François Pierron - Double bass (1,7) 
 Olivier Maurel - Vibraphone (2) 
 Monique Pierrot - 2nd Ondes Martenot (4,8) 
 Eric Groleau - Percussions, Drums (4,8,9) 
 Thierry Balasse - Soundscapes (6,9,10) 
 Marc Sens - Electric guitar (6,8) 
 Karen Nonnenmacher - Cymbalum (7) 
 Ophir Lévy - Oud (7) 
 Piotr Odrekhisky - Accordion (7)

References

2009 debut albums
Christine Ott albums